Echo Bay Airport  is a public use airport owned by and located in the Lake Mead National Recreation Area. It is 14 nautical miles (26 km) south of the central business district of Overton, a town in Clark County, Nevada, United States. The airport is situated near Echo Bay on Lake Mead.

Facilities and aircraft 
Echo Bay Airport covers an area of 11 acres (4 ha) at an elevation of 1,535 feet (468 m) above mean sea level. It has one runway designated 6/24 with an asphalt surface measuring 3,400 by 50 feet (1,036 x 15 m).

For the 12-month period ending January 31, 2011, the airport had 500 general aviation aircraft operations, an average of 41 per month. At that time there was one single-engine aircraft based at this airport.

See also 
 List of airports in Nevada

References

External links 
  from Nevada DOT
  
 Aerial image as of June 1994 from USGS The National Map
 

Airports in Clark County, Nevada